Inagta Alabat (Alabat Island Agta) is a Philippine Negrito language spoken in central Alabat Island, Philippines.

Inagta Lopez (also known as Inagta Lopenze) is a dialect reported to be spoken in Guinayangan. Aldrin Ludovice Salipande (2022) reports that it is spoken in Villa Espina and nearby barangays in Lopez, Quezon Province. Inagta Alabat is closely related since the Agta Alabat had originated from Lopez.

Classification
Inagta Alabat forms a subgroup with Manide. The extinct Katabangan may have also been related.

Lexicon
Selected Inagta Lopenze words from Salipande (2022):

References

Citations

Sources

 
 

Central Philippine languages
Aeta languages
Languages of Quezon